Vinayak Adinath Buwa (Devanagari: विनायक आदिनाथ बुवा), also known as V. A. Buwa, (born July 4, 1925, died April 17, 2011) was a Marathi writer from Maharashtra, India, known for his humorous stories and articles.

The following are some collections of his work:

 मराठी my बोली 
 नवर्‍यांवर पी एच डी
 एक ना धड विविध विनोदी साहित्य 
 खोडाल तर टिकाल
 चमचा चमचा ओळख
 अरेच्चा, एवढं वाढलंय

References

External links
 Official website

Buwa, Vinayak Adinath
Buwa, Vinayak Adinath
Buwa, Vinayak Adinath